Charles Turner Joy (17 February 1895 – 6 June 1956) was an admiral of the United States Navy during World War II and the Korean War.  During the last years of his career, while fighting leukemia, he served as Superintendent of the Naval Academy. The destroyer USS Turner Joy (DD-951) was named for him.

Early life
C. Turner Joy was born in St. Louis, Missouri, on February 17, 1895. Commissioned as an ensign in the Navy upon graduation from the United States Naval Academy in 1916, he served in the battleship  for more than four years, including the U.S. participation in World War I.

Interwar Period
In 1923, after receiving a graduate education in engineering, he began two years as Aide and Flag Lieutenant to Commander, Yangtze Patrol. This was followed by a tour as executive officer of the Asiatic Fleet destroyer , an assignment with the Bureau of Ordnance, sea duty in the battleship , and service at the Naval Mine Depot at Yorktown, Virginia. In the mid-1930s, Lieutenant Commander Joy was commanding officer of the destroyer  and was on the staff of Commander Destroyers, Battle Force. From 1937 to 1940, Commander Joy was an instructor at the Naval Academy. He then became executive officer of the heavy cruiser .

World War II
In 1941, Captain Joy was Operations Officer for Commander Scouting Force, Pacific Fleet. For several months after the United States entered World War II in December, he helped to plan and execute combat operations against Japan. He commanded the heavy cruiser  from September 1942 to June 1943 during which he was active in the Aleutians and South Pacific war theatres. After an important war plans tour in Washington, DC, Rear Admiral Joy became commander of a cruiser division, leading it through nearly a year and a half of intense combat service against the Japanese Navy.

Postwar and Korean War
Commanding an amphibious group when Japan capitulated in August 1945, Joy was soon assigned to duty in China. He was in charge of the Naval Proving Ground at Dahlgren, Virginia, in 1946 to 1949 and was then sent back to the Western Pacific to become Commander Naval Forces, Far East. Vice Admiral Joy held that position until mid-1952, directing much of the Navy's effort during the first two years of the Korean War. From July 1951 to May 1952, he was also the senior United Nations Delegate to the Korean Armistice talks.  His experience in this role led him to write a book, How Communists Negotiate.  In the book, he detailed a number of different tactics that were used during the talks to delay, frustrate, and create useful propaganda for the North Koreans.  His observations included the fact that the communists would set shorter chairs for the UN delegates so that the communists would tower over the UN delegates in propaganda photographs.

His final assignment was as Superintendent of the U.S. Naval Academy.

Last years and legacy
Retiring in July 1954, Admiral Joy subsequently made his home in La Jolla, California. He died at the U.S. Naval Hospital in San Diego, California on 6 June 1956. He is interred at the United States Naval Academy Cemetery.

The destroyer , 1959–1991, was named in honor of Admiral Joy. Turner Joy Road at the Naval Academy is also named in his honor.

Decorations
Vice Admiral Charles Turner Joy's ribbon bar:

See also

List of Superintendents of the United States Naval Academy
JMSDF-After World War II, new Japanese  Navy since 1954.

References

Obitutuary, Los Angeles Times, June 7, 1956, p. 7

External links

 history.navy.mil/photos: biography of C. Turner Joy
Finding aid to C. Turner Joy's papers at the Hoover Institution Library and Archives, Stanford University

1895 births
1956 deaths
United States Navy vice admirals
United States Naval Academy alumni
Military personnel from St. Louis
United States Navy personnel of World War I
United States Navy World War II admirals
United States Navy personnel of the Korean War
Burials at the United States Naval Academy Cemetery
Recipients of the Distinguished Service Cross (United States)
Recipients of the Navy Distinguished Service Medal
Recipients of the Distinguished Service Medal (US Army)
Recipients of the Legion of Merit
Superintendents of the United States Naval Academy
20th-century American academics